The World Snooker Championship is an annual snooker tournament founded in 1927, and played at the Crucible Theatre in Sheffield, England since 1977. The tournament is now played over seventeen days in late April and early May, and is chronologically the third of the three Triple Crown events of the season. The event was not held from 1941 to 1945 because of World War II and between 1958 and 1963 due to declining interest from players.

 the governing body that organises this event is the World Professional Billiards and Snooker Association (WPBSA). Prior to the WPBSA assuming control of the professional game in 1968, the world championship was organised by the Billiards Association and Control Council (BACC), except for between 1952 and 1957 when the Professional Billiards Players' Association (PBPA) staged their own event, the World Professional Match-play Championship, following a dispute with the BACC.

The most successful player at the World Snooker Championship is Joe Davis, who won fifteen consecutive titles between 1927 and 1946. The record in the modern era, usually dated from the reintroduction in 1969 of a knock-out tournament format, rather than a challenge format, is shared by Stephen Hendry and Ronnie O'Sullivan, both having won the title seven times.

Champions

Multiple champions

Notes

References

World champions
Snooker